Kushna Union is a union parishad situated at Kotchandpur Upazila,  in Jhenaidah District, Khulna Division of Bangladesh. There are 17 villages and 19 mouzas in the union.

References

External links
 

Unions of Khulna Division
Unions of Kotchandpur Upazila
Unions of Jhenaidah District